The Mexicali Institute of Technology is a college level technological institution located in the city of Mexicali, Baja California, Mexico. It started operations since 19 October 1981. The college is one of three technological institutes part of the national system of regional technological institutes in Baja California.

History
The Mexicali Institute of Technology began its activities on 19 October 1981. The demand of new options of higher education level to give support and service to the productive sector and the community and efforts of the board of teachers along with federal, state and municipal authorities led to the birth of this Institute. Due to these reasons, the Mexicali Institute of Technology began offering High Education Level courses, developing Institutional Integrity with the industry private sector. Since a decade ago the Mexicali Institute of Technology also offers master's and doctoral degrees.

Courses (Fields of Study)
Bachelor's degree (Licenciaturas)
1991 – Industrial Engineering (Ingeniería Industrial), Mechanical Engineering (Ingeniería Mecánica), Electrical Engineering (Ingeniería Eléctrica), Electronics Engineering (Ingeniería Electrónica) and Computer Science (Informática)

See also 
 Ensenada Institute of Technology
 Tijuana Institute of Technology

References

Education in Mexicali
Public universities and colleges in Mexico
Universities and colleges in Baja California
Educational institutions established in 1981
1981 establishments in Mexico